Achini Chamen (born ) is a Sri Lankan artistic gymnast, representing her nation at international competitions. She competed at the 2003 World Artistic Gymnastics Championships in Anaheim, California.

References

1983 births
Living people
Sri Lankan female artistic gymnasts
Place of birth missing (living people)